Bluey is an Australian animated television series for preschool children that premiered on ABC Kids on 1 October 2018. In April 2019, BBC Studios entered a partnership with Penguin Random House Australia with a deal to publish three Bluey books before the end of 2019. "The Beach", "Fruit Bat", and a sticker activity book entitled "Time to Play", were released on 5 November 2019. All three books were recognised as the highest-selling releases in the weekly Australian book charts of November 2019, and had sold a combined total of 350,000 copies by January 2020. "The Beach" was the highest-selling title of 2019 and sold 129,516 copies in the two months after its release. Additional books; "Bob Bilby" and "Easter Fun!", a craft book, were released on 3 March 2020, followed by a colouring book entitled "Big Backyard" on 31 March, and "The Creek" on 28 April. The combined sales of the first nine books reached 1 million in June 2020; the combined sales of all books reached 5 million in October 2022. In September 2020, the partnership with Penguin Random House was expanded to include global distribution rights, allowing the books to be released in the United States and the United Kingdom. As of December 2022, 50 titles have been released or are scheduled to be released in Australia.

Releases

Episodic board books

Episodic hardbacks

Other board books

Other hardbacks

Paperback books

Reception
In July 2020, Anita Butterworth of online blog Mum's Grapevine listed "The Beach" as the best Bluey book release, referring to votes made by readers. "The Creek" was listed as the second most popular instalment.

Awards and nominations

Notes

References

2019 introductions
2010s children's books
2010s television-related lists
2020s children's books
2020s television-related lists
Australian children's books
Australian television-related lists
Books based on television series
Lists of books based on works
Lists of children's books
Books